Progress Wrestling has held a variety of professional wrestling tournaments competed for by wrestlers that are a part of their roster.

Natural Progression Series

Natural Progression Series I

Natural Progression Series II

Natural Progression Series III

(*) Sebastian had to withdraw from the tournament due to injury.
(**) Replaced Sebastian.

Natural Progression Series IV

Natural Progression Series V

Natural Progression Series VI

Natural Progression Series VII

PROGRESS Championship Tournament (2012)

PROGRESS Women's Title #1 Contendership Tournament

PROGRESS Tag Team Championship Tournament

PROGRESS Tag Team Championship Tournament 2013

PROGRESS Tag Team Championship Tournament 2021

PROGRESS World Cup

World Cup (2014)

World Cup (2018)

Super Strong Style 16 Tournament

Super Strong Style 16 Tournament 2015

Super Strong Style 16 Tournament 2016

Super Strong Style 16 Tournament 2017

Super Strong Style 16 Tournament 2018

Super Strong Style 16 Tournament 2019

Super Strong Style 16 Tournament 2022

Other Tournaments

PROGRESS Revelations Of Divine Love (2017)

PROGRESS Revelations Of Divine Love (2021)

PROGRESS Atlas Championship Tournament (2022)

References

External links
PROGRESS Wrestling tournaments

Progress Wrestling
Professional wrestling tournaments
Professional wrestling-related lists